Piania  is a small village in Bhojpur district, Bihar  in India. This village is situated on the bank of Arrah Canal which originates from Dehri on Sone (Sone river). The connectivity to this village is by bus from Arrah. The distance between Arrah railway station and Piania is around 4 kilometre and population strength is around 7,000–10,000.

Locations
Pool: The canal bridge for road is termed as  pool . On pool, there are several shops including a sweet-shop, general store, motor-mechanic, local-restaurant, and a physician.

Math (temple): This temple is almost 400 years old. The deities which could be found in this temple are Lord Rama, Laxmana, and Seeta along with Hanumaan, Shiva, Parvati. It also has charan-padukas of khadeshwar guru who renovated this temple some 100 years ago.

References

Villages in Bhojpur district, India

hi:पियनिया
hi:भोजपुर, बिहार